Codevilla is a comune (municipality) in the Province of Pavia in the Italian region Lombardy, located about 60 km south of Milan and about 25 km southwest of Pavia. As of 31 December 2004, it had a population of 955 and an area of 13.0 km².

Codevilla borders the following municipalities: Montebello della Battaglia, Retorbido, Torrazza Coste, Voghera.

Demographic evolution

References

Cities and towns in Lombardy